Crandull is an unincorporated community in Johnson County, Tennessee, United States.

Crandall was the terminus of the Beaver Dam Railroad, which was built from Damascus, Virginia to the Empire Lumber and Mining Company's mill at Crandall.

References

Unincorporated communities in Johnson County, Tennessee
Unincorporated communities in Tennessee